In 2017, the University of Washington unveiled a bronze sculpture of Don James by Lou Cella outside Husky Stadium, in Seattle, Washington, United States.

References

2017 establishments in Washington (state)
2017 sculptures
Bronze sculptures in Washington (state)
Monuments and memorials in Washington (state)
Outdoor sculptures in Seattle
Sculptures of men in Washington (state)
Statues in Washington (state)